Oyler is a surname. Notable people with the surname include:

 Andy Oyler, American baseball player
 Chris Oyler, American Author
 Ray Oyler, American baseball player

See also
 Leonhard Euler, Swiss mathematician whose name is pronounced as 'OY-ler'
 
 
 Oiler (disambiguation)